Poundsgate is a small village in Dartmoor, Devon, England, located on the road between Ashburton and Princetown.

The postal area of "Poundsgate" is a wide geographical area. There are a few cottages clustered around a popular stopping point for travellers, the Tavistock Inn, which is thought to date back to the 13th century. There are also many farms in and around the village. At one time there was a shop, a post office and a garage.

Poundsgate takes its name from the pound situated on the left-hand side of the road just past the last house when travelling toward Princetown. This house was once a smithy, the post office, the telephone exchange and a bakery. Poundsgate is situated in the ecclesiastical parish of Leusdon, the civic parish of Widecombe and within the manor of Spitchwick.

It is even said to have been visited by the Devil (see the Great Thunderstorm, Widecombe).

External links
 
Photos of Poundsgate and surrounding area on Geograph

Villages in Devon
Dartmoor